The 2010 Malaysia Open Super Series was a badminton tournament which took place at Putra Indoor Stadium in Kuala Lumpur, Malaysia from 19 to 24 January 2010 and had a total purse of $200,000.

The 2010 Malaysia Open Super Series was the second tournament of the 2010 BWF Super Series and also part of the Malaysia Open championships, which had been held since 1937. This tournament was organized by the Badminton Association of Malaysia with the sanction of the BWF.

Men's singles

Seeds

Results

Women's singles

Seeds

*

Note: Lu Lan withdrew. Sung Ji-hyun of South Korea took her place in the bracket.

Results

Men's doubles

Seeds
 / Tan Boon Heong
 / Jung Jae-sung
 / Hendra Setiawan
 / Hendra Aprida Gunawan
 / Lee Wan Wah
 / Xu Chen
 / Nathan Robertson
 / Lin Yu Lang

Note: Kido and Setiawan withdrew. They were replaced by Luluk Hadiyanto and Joko Riyadi.

Results

Women's doubles

Seeds
 / Wang Xiaoli
 / Yu Yang
 / Chin Eei Hui
 / Meiliana Jauhari
 / Satoko Suetsuna
 / Anastasia Russkikh
 / Reika Kakiiwa
 / Kunchala Voravichitchaikul

Note: Maeda and Suetsuna withdrew. They were replaced by Lai Pei Jing and Lai Shevon Jemie of Malaysia.

Results

Mixed doubles

Seeds
 / Lee Hyo-jung
 / Lilyana Natsir
 / Ma Jin
 / Christinna Pedersen
 / Vita Marissa
 / Kunchala Voravichitchaikul
 / Nadieżda Kostiuczyk
 / Saralee Thoungthongkam

Note: Zheng Bo and Ma Jin withdrew. They were replaced by Toby Ng and Grace Gao of Canada.
Note: Nielsen and Pedersen withdrew. They were replaced by Tan Wee Kiong and Woon Khe Wei of Malaysia.

Results

References

External links
2010 Malaysia Open at tournamentsoftware.com

Malaysia Open (badminton)
Malaysia Super Series, 2010
Sport in Kuala Lumpur
Malaysia